Haji Ikram Qureshi is an Indian politician from the state of Uttar Pradesh. He is a member of 17th Legislative Assembly of Uttar Pradesh representing the Morabad constituency on a Samajwadi Party ticket. He is also the district president of the party.

Political career 
In 2012, Qureshi was made the chairman of the "Essential commodities corporation". After being elevated to the post, he celebrated by leading a procession. There it was found, that his supporters were throwing money in air. However, the Bulandshahr police said that they were unaware of such procession. In January 2017, he was made the Moradabad district president of Samajwadi Party, succeeding Athar Ali Ansari.

Though Qureshi's name did not feature in the list of candidates for the 2017 Uttar Pradesh Assembly election by Mulayam Singh Yadav, his son Akhilesh Yadav included him in his list. He was made a candidate for Moradabad Rural (succeeding sitting MLA Shameemul Haq) as he fitted Samajwadi Party's strategy of caste equation. He was also made a candidate for supporting Akhilesh Yadav in his family feud. In the 2017 Uttar Pradesh Assembly election, Qureshi emerged victorious by defeating his nearest rival, a Bahujan Samaj Party candidate by around 28 thousand votes. Qureshi polled 98 thousand votes compared to BSP's candidate Pannalal who won 69 thousand votes.

Controversy 
In April 2017, a Muslim girl, Shazia alleged that Qureshi's men had assaulted her and her family. She also claimed that the police refused to lodge a complaint as they were asked by Qureshi not to do so. So she went to chief minister Yogi Adityanath to lodge a complaint.

References 

Living people
Uttar Pradesh MLAs 2017–2022
Samajwadi Party politicians
1958 births